Mohamed Makhzangi (born 1950) is an Egyptian doctor and writer.

Early life
He was born in the town of Mansourah in the Nile delta. He studied medicine, and specialized in psychology and alternative medicine during a stint in the Soviet Union in the 1980s. He was based in the Ukrainian city of Kiev at the time of the Chernobyl disaster

Career
In 1986, and this formed the basis of his book Memories Of A Meltdown. Makhzangi gave up on medicine to become a journalist and writer. He worked for the Kuwaiti arts and culture magazine Al-Arabi before moving back to Cairo. He has published a number of short story collections and novels.

References

1950 births
Egyptian novelists
Egyptian male short story writers
Egyptian short story writers
Egyptian journalists
Egyptian psychologists
Living people
People from Dakahlia Governorate